Fondant is a mixture of sugar and water used as a confection, filling, or icing. Sometimes gelatin and glycerine are used as softeners or stabilizers.

There are numerous varieties of fondant, with the most basic being  poured fondant. Others include fondant icing, chocolate fondant, and honey fondant.

Poured fondant
Poured fondant is a creamy confection used as a filling or coating for cakes, pastries, and candies or sweets.

In its simplest form, it is sugar and water. Sometimes it is stabilized with gelatin and glycerine. It is cooked to the soft-ball stage, cooled slightly, and stirred or beaten to incorporate air, until it is an opaque mass with a creamy consistency. Sometimes lemon or vanilla is added to the mixture for taste. Other flavorings are used as well, as are various colorings. An example of its use is the Cadbury Creme Egg, the filling of which is inverted sugar syrup, produced by processing fondant with invertase. Fondant fancies are a type of cake typically coated in poured fondant.

See also
 Marzipan
 Pastry cream
 Sugar paste

References

Confectionery